Duck and Cover is a 1952 civil defense animated live-action social guidance film that is often popularly mischaracterized as propaganda.

With similar themes to the more adult oriented civil defense training films, the film was widely distributed to United States schoolchildren in the 1950s. It instructionally teaches students on what to do in the event of a nuclear explosion.

The film was funded by the US Federal Civil Defense Administration and released in January 1952. At the time, the Soviet Union was engaged in nuclear testing and the US was in the midst of the Korean War.

The film was written by Raymond J. Mauer, directed by Anthony Rizzo of Archer Productions, narrated by actor Robert Middleton, and made with the help of schoolchildren from New York City and Astoria, New York.

The film is in the public domain, and is widely available through Internet sources such as YouTube, as well as on DVD. This film was screened on Turner Classic Movies' Saturday night–Sunday morning film showcase series, TCM Underground.

In 2004, the film was selected for preservation in the United States National Film Registry by the Library of Congress as being "culturally, historically, or aesthetically significant."

Plot summary

The film starts with an animated sequence, showing an anthropomorphic turtle walking down a road, while picking up a flower and smelling it. A chorus sings the Duck and Cover theme:

Under the theme, Bert is shown being attacked by a monkey holding a lit firecracker or stick of dynamite on the end of a string. Bert ducks into his shell in the nick of time, as the charge goes off and destroys both the monkey and the tree in which he is sitting. Bert, however, is shown perfectly safe, because he ducked and covered.

The film then switches to live footage, as narrator Middleton explains what children should do "when you see the flash" of an atomic bomb. The movie goes on to suggest that by ducking down low in the event of a nuclear explosion, (crawling under desks and covering their necks with clasped hands) the children would be safer than they would be standing, and explains some basic survival tactics for nuclear war (facing any wall that might lend protection).

The last scene of the film returns to animation in which Bert the Turtle (voiced by Carl Ritchie) summarily asks what everybody should do in the event of an atomic bomb flash and is given the correct answer by a group of unseen children.

Purpose
After nuclear weapons were developed (the first having been developed during the Manhattan Project during World War II), it was realized what kind of danger they posed. The United States held a nuclear monopoly from the end of World War II until 1949, when the Soviets detonated their first nuclear device.

This signaled the beginning of the nuclear stage of the Cold War, and as a result, strategies for survival were thought out. Fallout shelters, both private and public, were built, but the government still viewed it as necessary to explain to citizens both the danger of the atomic (and later, hydrogen) bombs, and to give them some sort of training so that they would be prepared to act in the event of a nuclear strike.

The solution was the duck and cover campaign, of which Duck and Cover was an integral part. Shelters were built, drills were held in towns and schools, and the film was shown to schoolchildren. According to the United States Library of Congress (which declared the film "historically significant" and inducted it for preservation into the National Film Registry in 2004), it "was seen by millions of schoolchildren in the 1950s."

Other media
The song "Bert the Turtle (Duck and Cover)", performed by Dick Baker, was released as a commercial recording by Coral Records and accompanied by a color campaign pamphlet. It sold three million copies.

Accuracy and usefulness

Many historians and the nuclear disarmament public at large have generally sought to mock and dismiss civil defense advice as mere propaganda, including Amy Lutrell, who argues the film was made primarily as an American red scare political tool, to make children frightened of the Soviet Union and communism.

Detailed scientific research programs lay behind the much-mocked UK government civil defense pamphlets of the 1950s and 1960s, including the advice to promptly duck and cover. The advice to duck and cover has made a resurgence in recent years with new scientific evidence to support it.

While this (or any) tactic would be useless for someone at ground zero during a surface burst nuclear explosion, it would be beneficial to the vast majority of people who are positioned away from the blast hypocenter: both the thermal pulse of some weapons and the shrapnel from all weapons (particularly from shattered windows) could be evaded, at least in part. In particular, higher yield thermonuclear weapons have thermal pulses which last for several seconds. By promptly putting something between yourself and the fireball during these crucial couple of seconds, you could avoid or reduce the severity of the burns you would have otherwise received. For those not at ground zero, like a shortened version of the delay between lightning and thunder, there would be a delay between the flash (indicating the need to duck and cover) and the arrival of the blast wave, which will shatter windows turning non-safety glass into missile-like shards, and cause other blast or impact injuries.

To highlight the effect that being indoors can make, despite the lethal radiation and blast zone extending well past her position at Hiroshima, Akiko Takakura survived the effects of a 16 kt atomic bomb at a distance of 300 meters from the hypocenter, with only minor injuries, due in most part to her position in the lobby of the bank of Japan, a reinforced concrete building, at the time of the nuclear explosion. In contrast, the unknown person sitting outside, fully exposed, on the steps of the Sumitomo bank, next door to the bank of Japan, received third-degree burns and was then likely killed by the blast, in that order, within 2 seconds.

The advice to cover one's head with anything available, like the picnic blanket and newspaper used by the family in the film, may seem absurd at first when one considers the capabilities of a nuclear weapon, but even a thin barrier such as cloth can reduce the severity of burns on the skin from the thermal radiation – which is light rays in the ultraviolet, visible, and infrared range, and it is this combination of light rays that delivers the burning energy to exposed skin areas; this burning thermal energy would be experienced by people within range for several seconds after the explosion. A photograph taken about 1.3 km from the hypocenter of the Hiroshima bomb explosion showed that even leaves from a nearby shrub protected a wooden telephone pole from charring discoloration due to thermal radiation, while the rest of the telephone pole not under the protection of the leaves was charred almost completely black.

Depending on the yield and distance from the explosion the burst of ionizing radiation from the fireball would arrive at an observer's position at the same time as the light flash, leaving the observer little to no time to find cover from this aspect of a nuclear detonation, but subsequently some of this radiation is absorbed and re-emitted by heated fireball air molecules at lower wavelengths, so harmful ionizing radiation may continue for up to a minute during which time ducking and covering would go some way in limiting one's exposure.

Alongside the misapprehension that all nuclear weapons have increased in yield to levels of the 50 Megaton Tsar Bomba, instead of the reality that the more militarily effective and numerous nuclear weapons are those akin to the W76 and Russian Bulava, which have a yield of approximately 100 to 200 kiloton (0.2 Megaton) and as it is these explosive devices that equip the submarine fleets of the US, Britain and Russia, it is therefore these explosive devices that are most likely to be encountered by civilians.<ref>Ch. 1: The Dangers from Nuclear Weapons: Myths and Facts – Nuclear War Survival Skills Today(1980s) few if any of Russia's huge intercontinental ballistic missiles (ICBMs) are armed with a 20-megaton warhead. Now a huge Russian ICBM, the SS-18, typically carries 10 warheads, each having a yield of 500 kilotons, each programmed to hit a separate target. See Jane's Weapon Systems, 1987–88.]</ref> The other similarly common misapprehension or criticism of duck and cover that is frequently encountered is the opinion that prompt ionizing radiation effects would still kill those who duck and cover, regardless of any preventive measures taken. However this is generally incorrect unless any nuclear weapon more powerful than 10–30 kilotons is detonated, and even in that case, if the person is indoors the absorbed radiation dose is again not life-threatening. For example, despite the film not being made in the era of megaton-range weapons, for exposed individuals taking no preventive countermeasures the range of harmful ionizing radiation effects stays within a circle of radius 2–3 km from ground zero during airbursts of 1 megaton in yield, yet the blast range that would be expected to be lethal to 50% of people is 7.5 km, and the range of thermal effects lethal to 50% of people stretching out to 11 km from ground zero. Naturally, within this 3 km range from a 1-megaton airburst, the fatality rate would be near total for those caught in the open from the extreme blast pressure alone, before any potential radiation sickness could begin.

However, for one caught in the open outside this ~3-kilometer radius from ground zero from a 1-megaton weapon, ducking and covering would drastically increase one's chance of survival, as at this range the radiation hazard is near zero, whereas that from the blast is a chance of 50% fatality at a ~7.5 km range and that of thermal effects 11 km.

If someone was caught in the open, and by surprise, by the same 1-megaton weapon detonation, but ducked and covered in 2 seconds time from first noticing the moment of flash, then that person would have prevented themselves from being exposed to the full brunt of the 1-megaton explosion's thermal energy; instead, approximately 55% of the explosion's total thermal flash energy would have been absorbed over these 2 seconds. In this example, as there is now a 45% reduction in the amount of heat experienced by one ducking and covering, the median lethal thermal range from this 1-megaton weapon can now be more accurately described as equivalent to absorbing the entire flash energy from a 0.55 Mt or 550 kt weapon, if one ducks and covers in 2 seconds.

Hence, one's chance of survival at 11 km goes from the previous 50% chance of death if they just stood there, gazing at the 1-megaton fireball as it emits all its energy over tens of seconds, to now a mere sunburn, or a 1st-degree burn injury on exposed skin. With the 50% lethal thermal range being thus downrated to being equivalent to a 550 kt explosion, the 50% lethal thermal radius goes from the previous 11 km without ducking and covering to ~7 km with prompt duck and covering within 2 seconds. 
One can think of this as going from a scenario where before the majority of people caught in the open, who just stood there staring at the fireball out to a radius of 11 km would probably die from lethal 3rd-degree burns on their unclothed skin, to a scenario where instead the vast majority of people who 'duck and cover' from 7 km out to 11 km would remain alive, with generally non life-threatening 1st-degree burns and 2nd-degree burns over their exposed skin, with the burn severity naturally depending on their range from the explosion.

Finally, all the lethal ranges given in the referenced graphs, and when discussing the range of effects of nuclear explosions in general, one must keep in mind what is presented is the most pessimistic of weapon effects ranges. As the scaling laws these tables and graphs were derived from assume a simplistic flat terrain with no intervening skyscrapers or other objects that would attenuate the blast and provide shadowing from the thermal effects. When real world city terrain topography is included in these weapon effects calculations the lethal ranges are downgraded considerably.

According to the 1946 book Hiroshima, in the days between the Hiroshima and Nagasaki atomic bombs in Japan, one Hiroshima policeman went to Nagasaki to teach police about ducking after the atomic flash. As a result of this timely warning, not a single Nagasaki policeman died in the initial blast. This allowed more surviving Nagasaki police to organize relief efforts than in Hiroshima. Unfortunately, the general population was not warned of the heat/blast danger following an atomic flash because of the bomb's unknown nature. Many people in Hiroshima and Nagasaki died while searching the skies for the source of the brilliant flash.

Recent scientific analysis has largely supported the general idea of sheltering indoors in response to a nuclear explosion. Staying indoors can offer protection both from the initial blast as well as the following radioactive fallout that accumulates during the aftermath. Additionally, such a response would leave roads clear for emergency vehicles to access the area. This is termed the shelter in place protocol, and together with emergency evacuation advice, they are the two countermeasures to take when the direct effects of nuclear explosions are no longer life-threatening and the need for protective shielding from coming in contact with nuclear weapon debris/fallout in the aftermath of the explosion, begins to become a concern.

Historical context

The United States' monopoly on nuclear weapons was broken by the Soviet Union in 1949 when it tested its first nuclear explosive (Joe-1), and with this many in the US government and public perceived that the nation was more vulnerable than it had ever been before. Duck-and-cover exercises quickly became a part of Civil Defense drills that every American citizen, from children to the elderly, practiced to be ready in the event of nuclear war. In 1950, during the first big Civil Defense push of the Cold War and coinciding with the Alert America! initiative to educate Americans on nuclear preparedness; The adult-orientated Survival Under Atomic Attack was published and contains "duck and cover" or more accurately, cover-and-then-duck advice without using those specific terms in its Six Survival Secrets For Atomic Attacks section. 1. Try To Get Shielded 2. Drop Flat On Ground Or Floor 3. Bury Your Face In Your Arms ("crook of your elbow"). The child-orientated film Duck and Cover was produced a year later by the Federal Civil Defense Administration in 1951.

Education efforts on the effects of nuclear weapons proceeded with stops-and-starts in the US due to competing alternatives. In a once classified, 1950s era, US war game that looked at varying levels of war escalation, warning and pre-emptive attacks in the late 1950s early 1960s, it was estimated that approximately 27 million US citizens would have been saved with civil defense education. At the time however the cost of a full-scale civil defense program was regarded as lesser in effectiveness, in cost-benefit analysis than a ballistic missile defense (Nike Zeus) system, and as the Soviet adversary was believed to be rapidly increasing their nuclear stockpile, the efficacy of both would begin to enter a diminishing returns trend. When more became known about the cost and limitations of the Nike Zeus system, in the early 1960s the head of the department of defense determined once again that fallout shelters would save more Americans for far less money.

The production of Duck and Cover in 1951 by the Federal Civil Defense Administration occurred during the height of the Korean War (1950–1953), and coincided with the first Desert Rock exercises in the Nevada desert which were designed to familiarize the US military with fighting alongside battlefield nuclear weapons, as it was feared that a resolution to the Korean War might need the theater of operations to first expand across the border into the People's Republic of China and require nuclear weapons to end it.

The film was also produced at least one year before the first "hydrogen bomb" or megaton range explosive device was demonstrated to be possible, with test shot Ivy Mike in 1952. At least four years before the first true "hydrogen bomb" of the Soviet Union (USSR), the RDS-37, on November 22, 1955, which yielded 1.6 megatons. About 6 years before the first successful test launch of the world's first intercontinental ballistic missile (ICBM), the Soviet Union's R-7 in 1957, up until this time strategic bombers were not but one of the three strategic nuclear triad delivery systems of the modern era but the sole intercontinental nuclear weapon delivery system capable of reaching the US from the Soviet Union and vice versa.

Before advances in precision guided munitions and physics package miniaturization, "city busting" or countervalue targeting, was a more likely nuclear war scenario, as effective counterforce warfare with nuclear weapons had yet to become all that conceivable, with the potential exceptions of being used in roles where a low degree of accuracy would not result in a waste of a bomb, such as destroying large "rear area" military bases, aircraft carriers, Communist human wave attacks, massive mine fields in trench warfare (which was what the Korean War escalated into), radiological area denial and used at night prior to a frontal assault in the hopes of inducing widespread enemy troop flash blindness. Practically all other counterforce uses of this eras nuclear weapons would be ineffective due to force dispersal, weather factors, poor munition accuracy and the unwieldy physics packages of the nuclear weapons of the era, making them generally unfit for the mobile battlefield. This would therefore make it likely that combatants who have escalated to the point of contemplating nuclear exchanges would use their nuclear weapons on immobile and valuable targets, such as the war supporting infrastructure of cities.

It is now estimated that it was not until after 1957 that the USSR attained more than about 50 nuclear munitions in its nuclear weapons arsenal. Almost all of this stockpile was likely designed to be air dropped by the Myasishchev M-4 and Tupolev Tu-4 bombers as strategic nuclear weapons on US and West European NATO cities respectively. Large numbers of small true tactical nuclear weapons only began to seriously populate the USSR's stockpile in the 1970s and beyond.

Legacy
Appearance in other media
The 1982 film The Atomic Cafe, a satirical collage documentary film, uses footage from the Duck and Cover. Both films (the documentary in 2016) were inducted into the National Film Registry.

The video for "Weird Al" Yankovic's 1986 song "Christmas at Ground Zero" features footage from the film, mostly during an instrumental break. Bert the Turtle is shown in time with the lyric 'I'll duck and cover/ with my Yuletide lover'.

The video for Peter Gabriel's 1980 song "Games Without Frontiers" features footage from the film at the end of song.

The 2015 Oscar-winning film Bridge of Spies, about an exchange of captured spies between the U.S. and Soviet Union during the Cold War, features a prominent scene in which grade school children watch Duck and Cover in their classroom.

In the 1997 South Park episode "Volcano", the South Park residents are urged to "duck and cover" by a volcano safety film which loosely parodies Duck and Cover. This proves ineffective as the people who follow the film's advice are subsequently disintegrated by the lava from the volcanic eruption with only their skeletons remaining.

The 1999 Warner Brothers animated feature film, The Iron Giant, set in 1957, features a social guidance film-within-a-film titled, Atomic Holocaust, the style and tone of which parodies the film. In another instance, near the end of the feature film, the villainous character Kent Mansley suggests they duck and cover into a fallout shelter in response to an offshore nuclear SLBM Polaris missile being launched by mistake at their position by the USS Nautilus, however all the other male adults in the vicinity claim that this would be of "no use", convincing bystanders and the young protagonist at the heart of the feature film to not attempt to evacuate to shelter.

RiffTrax also spoofed this film in 2015.Duck and Cover (RiffTrax Trailer) on official YouTube channel

See also
 Duck and cover, for further discussion of this method of self-defense.
 List of films about nuclear issues
 List of films in the public domain in the United States
 Civil Defence Information Bulletin, a 1964 British film which deals with the same topic.
 Protect and Survive, a 1970s–80s British information film on the same topic.
 NYC Emergency Management Public Service Announcement on what to do in the event of a nuclear bomb—https://www.youtube.com/watch?v=zznmdUJbeU8

 Notes 

References

External links

 Duck and Cover at the TCM Movie Database
Duck and Cover essay by Jake Hughes on the National Film Registry websiteDuck and Cover'' essay by Daniel Eagan in America's Film Legacy: The Authoritative Guide to the Landmark Movies in the National Film Registry, A&C Black, 2010 , pages 451–453 America's Film Legacy: The Authoritative Guide to the Landmark Movies in the National Film Registry
 Production History of Duck and Cover
 A critical assessment of ducking and covering(waybackmachine)

1952 films
1952 animated films
1952 short films
1950s American animated films
1950s animated short films
American black-and-white films
American social guidance and drug education films
Animated films about turtles
United States National Film Registry films
Disaster preparedness in the United States
Films about nuclear war and weapons
Cold War films
Articles containing video clips
Nuclear safety and security
United States civil defense
Short films with live action and animation
1950s English-language films